Uta (also known as Oeta, Auta, or Aoeta) is a coastal village in  Central Papua, Indonesia.

Climate
Uta has a tropical rainforest climate (Af) with heavy to very heavy rainfall year-round.

References

Villages in Central Papua